The  1973 Denmark Open  in Badminton took place from 12 to 17 March 1973  in Copenhagen.

Final results

References 

Denmark Open
Denmark